Alexander David Hugh Grimes (born 8 January 1965) is an English former cricketer.

Grimes was educated at Tonbridge School, before going up to Pembroke College, Cambridge. While studying at Cambridge, he made his debut in first-class cricket for Cambridge University against Hampshire at Fenner's in 1984. He played first-class cricket for Cambridge until 1985, making thirteen appearances. Playing as a right-arm medium pace bowler, Grimes was ineffective in his thirteen matches for Cambridge, taking 12 wickets at an expensive average of 75.58 and best figures of 3 for 99. Additionally, with the bat, he scored 101 runs with a high score of 22 not out. In addition to playing first-class cricket while at Cambridge, he also made six List A one-day appearances for the Combined Universities cricket team, making three appearances apiece in the 1984 and 1985 Benson & Hedges Cup. Grimes was a more effective bowler in one-day cricket, taking 13 wickets at an average of 19.00, which included a five-wicket haul when he took figures of 5 for 36 against Sussex.

References

External links

1965 births
Living people
Sportspeople from Beirut
People educated at Tonbridge School
Alumni of Pembroke College, Cambridge
English cricketers
Cambridge University cricketers
British Universities cricketers